Ernst Brandes (3 October 1758 – 13 May 1810) was a Hannoverian lawyer, official, writer, and scholar.

Brandes witnessed the French Revolution as a journalist. Influenced by Edmund Burke, he is regarded by commentators as a voice of conservatism and Anglophile political views during the Enlightenment.

His 1787 treatise Ueber die Weiber argued against the emerging feminist notion of the equality of the sexes.

Works
 Ueber die Weiber (Leipzig, 1787)

References

Bibliography
 Carl Haase: Ernst Brandes in den Jahren 1805 und 1806. Fünf Briefe an den Grafen Münster. In: Niedersächsisches Jahrbuch für Landesgeschichte (NsJbLG). 34, 1962, S. 194
 Walter Richter: Der Esperance- und ZN-Orden, in: Einst und Jetzt. Jahrbuch 1974 des Vereins für corpsstudentische Geschichtsforschung, S. 30-54

1758 births
1810 deaths
German male journalists
German journalists
Jurists from Hanover
Writers from Hanover
German male writers
Members of the Göttingen Academy of Sciences and Humanities